is a Japanese politician of the Democratic Party of Japan, a member of the House of Councillors in the Diet (national legislature). A native of Kyoto, Kyoto and graduate of Ritsumeikan University, he was elected for the first time in 2007 after working at Teijin since 1987.

References

External links 
  in Japanese.

Members of the House of Councillors (Japan)
Ritsumeikan University alumni
Living people
1964 births
Democratic Party of Japan politicians